The High Commissioner of Malaysia to the Islamic Republic of Pakistan is the head of Malaysia's diplomatic mission to Pakistan. The position has the rank and status of an Ambassador Extraordinary and Plenipotentiary and is based in the High Commission of Malaysia, Islamabad.

List of heads of mission

High Commissioners to Pakistan

See also
 Malaysia–Pakistan relations

References 

 
Pakistan
Malaysia